Delplanqueia dilutella is a species of moth in the family Pyralidae. It was described by Michael Denis and Ignaz Schiffermüller in 1775. It is found in most of Europe (except Norway and Ukraine), east to Russia, Turkey, Iran and Mongolia.

The wingspan is 18–26 mm. Adults are on wing from May to June in one generation per year.

The larvae feed on Thymus serpyllum, Thymus drucei and Polygala species. They form a silken gallery sometimes including debris from the nests of the ant Lasius flavus. Pupation takes place in a cocoon in the soil or amongst leaf detritus.

References

Moths described in 1775
Phycitini
Moths of Europe
Moths of Asia